Monocerotis is the Latin genitive of the constellation name Monoceros.

Objects within the constellation include:

Bayer designations
Alpha Monocerotis (α Mon)
Beta Monocerotis (β Mon)

Flamsteed designations
11 Monocerotis (11 Mon)
15 Monocerotis (15 Mon)

Variable star designations
R Monocerotis (V1 Mon)
S Monocerotis (V2 Mon)
BT Monocerotis (V98 Mon)
V592 Monocerotis (V592 Mon)
V616 Monocerotis (V616 Mon)
V838 Monocerotis (V838 Mon)

Novae designations
Nova Monocerotis 1939
Nova Monocerotis 2002

Other designations
Plaskett's star